Rafic Hariri Stadium, also known as Al Manara Stadium or Nejmeh Stadium, is a multi-use stadium in the Manara district of Beirut, Lebanon. It is currently used mostly for football matches and serves as the home for Nejmeh. The stadium has a capacity of 5,000 spectators, as well as a VIP seats area that accommodates around 100 guests, a cafeteria, and a gymnasium.

History

The Old Stadium
The old club stadium first consisted of a sand training field over the land number 704 in Ras Beirut area with no facilities or fences. The club teams used to practice under poor conditions.

The former club administrations had worked very hard on enhancing the conditions by first building players facilities and administration offices around the stadium in 1969, the wall followed in 1974.

The fact that the old stadium used to host the daily training sessions of all the club teams including around 150 players, as well as many official and friendly matches for most of the Football teams in Lebanon didn't allow the implantation of natural grass.

The dream came true in the year 2004, and the fans can now enjoy the sight of their first team training on a professional field in order to achieve the best results in the local and regional competitions.

Renaming
After the assassination of the Lebanese Prime Minister Rafic Hariri, Nejmeh club's board of directors expressed its condolences to the family of the martyr and especially the Guardian of the Club Sheikh Bahaaeddine Hariri, and decided on Monday February 21, 2005 to call the club stadium "The Martyr Rafic Hariri Stadium" to immortalize his memory, and recognize his favors to the Lebanese Sports in general, and to Nejmeh Club in specific.

Present 
The Club stadium is currently under rehabilitation including implanting the field with grass, increasing the seats spaces to allow more spectators, and enhancing the stadium facilities, walls and fences. The first phase of the process started in June 2003 and was completed in late March 2004.

The stadium field was implanted with natural grass of the highest quality to provide the first team players with the best training conditions in Lebanon. In this direction, the administration took the decision to relocate the youth team's training sessions to a different field in Bir Hassan area to avoid pressure on the newly implanted grass by the large number of players.

The second phase of the rehabilitation process including enhancing the club facilities, walls, and fences are currently underway and shall be completed later in 2004.

This rehabilitation process was among the first objectives of the current club administration headed by president Mohammad Fanj and guided by Sheikh Bahaaeddine Hariri who made a visit to the old stadium on March 28, 2003 to witness the conditions of the stadium, and listen to the views, and demands of the team players, staff, & club administration.

References

External links 
 Official website

Football venues in Beirut
Nejmeh SC